Three Reservists is a Bulgarian comedy-drama war film released in 1971, directed by Zako Heskiya, starring Georgi Partsalev, Kiril Gospodinov and Nikola Anastasov.

The winter of 1945, the First Bulgarian Army is engaged in the battles for the liberation of Hungary from the Nazis during the Second World War. Three men are sent to join the army, but they are completely unprepared and without a clear idea of warfare. They are laughable with their inability to cope with their tasks.

Upon its release, the film won wide popularity. The memorable performances by Partsalev, Gospodinov and Anastasov turned their characters into favorites of the audience. Three Reservists became one of the film classics of the Bulgarian cinematography from those years.

Cast
Georgi Partsalev as Ivan Staykov
Nikola Anastasov as Peyo Vutov
Kiril Gospodinov as Spiro Stoimenov
Valcho Kamarashev as the master sergeant
Stoycho Mazgalov as the assistant commander
Tünde Szabó as Ilonka (the Hungarian girl)
Bella Tsoneva as Peyo's wife
Vasil Popiliev as the commander
Slavcho Mitev
Dimitar Yordanov
Dimiter Milushev
Gani Staykov
Nikola Dobrev
Vasil Yotov
Vladimir Davcev
Nikola Dadov

References

Sources

External links
 
 Three Reservists at the Bulgarian National Film Archive 
 Three Reservists at the Bulgarian National Television 

1971 films
1971 comedy-drama films
1970s Bulgarian-language films
Films directed by Zako Heskija
Bulgarian World War II films
Bulgarian comedy-drama films
Films set in Bulgaria
Films shot in Bulgaria
1971 comedy films
1971 drama films